Frederick Robert Pitts (October 23, 1898 – October 19, 1988) was an American modern pentathlete. He competed at the 1924 Summer Olympics.

Biography
Frederick Pitts was born in Philadelphia on October 23, 1898.

He graduated from the United States Military Academy at West Point in 1920, and was commissioned as a 2nd lieutenant of cavalry. He would go on to attain the rank of colonel.

He died in Winter Park, Florida on October 19, 1988, and was buried at Arlington National Cemetery.

References

External links
 

1898 births
1988 deaths
American male modern pentathletes
Olympic modern pentathletes of the United States
Modern pentathletes at the 1924 Summer Olympics
Sportspeople from Philadelphia
20th-century American people
Burials at Arlington National Cemetery
United States Military Academy alumni